Gutstein is a German surname, literally meaning "good stone". Notable people with the surname include:

 Adam Gutstein, American business executive
 Ernst Gutstein (1924–1998), Austrian operatic baritone
 Daniel Gutstein (born 1968), American writer
 Rabbi Morris Aaron Gutstein (1905–1987), American rabbi
 Solomon Gutstein (born 1934), American author, authority on Illinois Real Estate Law, and Alderman

German-language surnames